"Super Kind of Woman" is a 1973 single by Freddie Hart and the Heartbeats.  "Super Kind of Woman" was Freddie Hart's fifth number one on the country charts.  The single stayed at number one for a single week and spent twelve weeks on the country chart.

Charts

Weekly charts

Year-end charts

References
 

1973 singles
Freddie Hart songs
1973 songs
Songs written by Jack Grayson